Her Soldier Sweetheart is a 1910 American silent film, produced by Kalem Company and directed by Sidney Olcott.

References

 The Moving Picture World, Vol 6, p 396 ; p 420 ; p 437
 The New York Dramatic Mirror, 19 mars 1910, p 17

External links
 AFI Catalog

 Her Soldier Sweetheart website dedicated to Sidney Olcott

1910 films
Silent American drama films
American silent short films
Films directed by Sidney Olcott
1910 short films
1910 drama films
American black-and-white films
1910s American films